James Tuite (14 November 1849 – 6 October 1916) was an Irish watchmaker and politician.

James Tuite was a watchmaker, a business inherited from his father. He was educated at St Mary's College, Mullingar, and was chairman of Mullingar Town Commissioners, 1881–1887.

He was elected Member of Parliament for North Westmeath in the general election of 1885, and remained as MP for the constituency until the election of 1900. At one stage he was imprisoned for three months as a Land League suspect. He joined the Anti-Parnellite Irish National Federation in 1891 and served as a whip.

Notes

External links 

1849 births
1916 deaths
Irish Parliamentary Party MPs
Anti-Parnellite MPs
Members of the Parliament of the United Kingdom for County Westmeath constituencies (1801–1922)
UK MPs 1885–1886
UK MPs 1886–1892
UK MPs 1892–1895
UK MPs 1895–1900
People from Mullingar